Leslie Freemantle (11 May 1898 – 6 June 1963) was an Australian cricketer. He played five first-class cricket matches for Victoria between 1920 and 1924.

See also
 List of Victoria first-class cricketers
 List of Western Australia first-class cricketers

References

External links
 

1898 births
1963 deaths
Australian cricketers
Victoria cricketers
Western Australia cricketers
Cricketers from Melbourne
People from Canterbury, Victoria